Mathias Jung (born 17 December 1958 in Trusetal) is a former East German biathlete.

Biathlon results
All results are sourced from the International Biathlon Union.

Olympic Games
1 medal (1 silver)

World Championships
3 medals (2 gold, 1 silver)

*During Olympic seasons competitions are only held for those events not included in the Olympic program.

References

External links
 

1958 births
Living people
German male biathletes
Biathletes at the 1980 Winter Olympics
Olympic biathletes of East Germany
Medalists at the 1980 Winter Olympics
Olympic medalists in biathlon
Olympic silver medalists for East Germany
Biathlon World Championships medalists
People from Schmalkalden-Meiningen
Sportspeople from Thuringia